The 1992 edition of The Winston was a stock car racing competition that took place on May 16, 1992. Held at Charlotte Motor Speedway in Concord, North Carolina, the 70-lap race was an exhibition race in the 1992 NASCAR Winston Cup Series. This was the first broadcast of The Winston on TNN, which aired the event until 2000. It was also better known as One Hot Night because it was the first ever race that was held on a superspeedway at night. Davey Allison of Robert Yates Racing won the pole, led the most laps, and won the race. This was also the final appearance of Richard Petty and Alan Kulwicki at The Winston; Petty retired at the end of the season and Kulwicki was killed in a plane crash on April 1, 1993.

Background

The Winston was open to race winners from last season through the 1992 Winston 500 at Talladega Superspeedway and all previous All-Star race winners and NASCAR Winston Cup champions who had attempted to qualify for every race in 1992 were eligible to compete in the All-Star Race.

1992 The Winston drivers and eligibility

Race winners in 1991 and 1992
2-Rusty Wallace (2 wins in 1991)
3-Dale Earnhardt (4 wins in 1991)
4-Ernie Irvan (2 wins in 1991, including the 1991 Daytona 500)
5-Ricky Rudd (1 win in 1991)
6-Mark Martin (2 wins from 1991 and 1992)
7-Alan Kulwicki (2 wins from 1991 and 1992)
11-Bill Elliott (5 wins from 1991 and 1992)
15-Geoffrey Bodine (1 win in 1991)
17-Darrell Waltrip (1 win in 1991)
18-Dale Jarrett (1 win in 1991)
25-Ken Schrader (2 wins in 1991)
28-Davey Allison (8 wins from 1991 and 1992, including the 1992 Daytona 500)
33-Harry Gant (5 wins in 1991)
42-Kyle Petty (1 win in 1991)

Winning team owners in 1991 and 1992
9-Melling Racing with new driver Dave Mader III (1 win in 1991 with Bill Elliott)
21-Wood Brothers Racing with new driver Morgan Shepherd (1 win in 1991 with Dale Jarrett)

Previous NASCAR Winston Cup Champions
43-Richard Petty (7-time NASCAR Winston Cup Series Champion)
94-Terry Labonte (1984 NASCAR Winston Cup Series Champion)

Top two finishers of The Winston Open
12-Hut Stricklin (finished second)
30-Michael Waltrip (finished first)

Race summary
At the very end of the race, Kyle Petty and Dale Earnhardt were battling for the lead, and heading into turn three, Petty spun Earnhardt and Davey Allison stalked Petty at the final corner. They were side-by-side and Allison beat him at the line, and then was spun out and crashed into the wall hard and slid all the way into turn one. Allison was taken to the hospital and did not celebrate in victory lane. It was considered one of the most memorable moments in all-star race history. That was also Allison's second straight victory in the event. In The Winston Open, Michael Waltrip and Hut Stricklin finished first and second, respectively, to make the starting grid. It was also the first time that past champions were eligible, even though they did not win (Richard Petty and Terry Labonte).

Segment 1
Allison won the pole for the all-star event and the accompanying $50,000 bonus from Winston on Friday evening during the unique three-lap, two-tire pit stop qualifying run. Geoff Bodine served as the onboard camera car throughout the race. When the green flag flew for the first 30-lap segment, Allison jumped out to the early lead and showed the field his heels for the entire 30 circuits, earning him another $50,000 bonus.

Segment results
28-Davey Allison ($50,000)
11-Bill Elliott ($15,000)
2-Rusty Wallace ($7,500)

Segment 2
During the 10-minute break between segments, the fan balloting on whether or not to invert the field for the second 30-lap segment was unveiled. The fans had spoken and the result flashed on the Winston Cup scoreboard — INVERT!

Allison and his lightning-fast Ford Thunderbird was sent to the rear of the field, while Bodine assumed the point. Two laps into the second segment, Richard Petty moved into second and worked on Bodine in a valiant effort for the lead. But four laps into the second segment, Kyle Petty blew by both his father and Bodine to take over first. After a spirited battle with Ernie Irvan and Dale Earnhardt, Petty cruised on to a two-second victory over Irvan to collect the $50,000 bonus for winning the second segment. Allison had charged all the way back to sixth. So, the final stage was set.

Segment results
42-Kyle Petty ($50,000)
4-Ernie Irvan ($15,000)
3-Dale Earnhardt ($7,500)

Segment 3
For the final 10-lap shootout, Earnhardt muscled his way past Irvan for second. That close racing allowed Petty to sprint out to a substantial lead. With Kyle pulling away, it appeared nobody would be able to catch him, but on the third lap, Darrell Waltrip was tapped from the rear, sending him dirt-tracking through the tri-oval grass in front of the main grandstand. Waltrip nearly corrected his Chevrolet Lumina, but stalled momentarily at the end of pit road, prompting the first and only caution of the final segment. The caution erased a 3.5 second Petty lead.

Caution flag laps do not count in the final segment, setting up a seven-lap dash. During all the action, Allison had moved into third, making it Petty, Earnhardt and Allison at the restart. On the restart, Petty held his own for one lap. But with five laps remaining, Earnhardt drove past Petty for the lead. At the white flag, Earnhardt led, Petty was a close second and Allison was third. Down the backstretch, Petty took a run at Earnhardt. Earnhardt reacted by forcing Petty down on the backstretch apron. Meanwhile, Allison inched closer to the leaders. Going into turn three, both Earnhardt and Petty were too low and going full speed. Earnhardt hit the corner first and lost control of his Chevrolet in the middle of the turn. Petty lifted from the throttle for just a split second to gather his Pontiac Grand Prix. While Petty checked up, Allison continued at full throttle and got a strong drive off of turn four. Allison pulled to the inside of Petty in the middle of the tri-oval, and had the momentum. Petty and Allison touched twice before Allison inched ahead to take the checkered flag. The two touched again as they crossed the start-finish line, sending Allison's Texaco Ford spinning wildly into the frontstraight wall. The car hit hard on the driver's side before a trail of sparks led to its final resting place in the infield grass. Allison, who was momentarily knocked unconscious, was removed from the car via the "Jaws of Life." After a brief examination in the infield care center, Allison was airlifted to Carolinas Medical Center, where he remained for two days because of a broken collarbone and bruises over more than half of his body.

The helicopter buzzed Victory Lane where Allison's team accepted the trophy and $200,000.00 check on his behalf. Allison quipped while lying in his hospital room, "This is the darndest victory lane I've ever been in. I guess the good news is I won $300,000.00, but the bad news is most of that will go towards the hospital bills". Ken Schrader, three consecutive times a runner-up in The Winston, finished third, while Ricky Rudd and Bill Elliott rounded out the top five. Earnhardt's spin relegated him to 14th place.

References

Winston, The
Winston, The
NASCAR races at Charlotte Motor Speedway
NASCAR All-Star Race